John Adams Morgan (born September 17, 1930) is an American sailor and Olympic champion and the founder and chairman of Morgan Joseph. His father, Henry Sturgis Morgan, was the co-founder of Morgan Stanley and his great-grandfather was J. P. Morgan, founder of J.P. Morgan & Co.

Early life
John Adams Morgan was born on September 17, 1930, in Oyster Bay on Long Island to Henry Sturgis Morgan and Catherine Frances Lovering Adams. His mother was the daughter of Frances Lovering and Charles Francis Adams III, the U.S. Secretary of the Navy under President Herbert Hoover, and a direct descendant of U.S. Presidents John Adams and his son John Quincy Adams. John attended the Groton School, graduating in 1949.  He then attended Yale University, graduating with a Bachelor of Arts in 1953.

Career

Olympic career
He competed at the 1952 Summer Olympics in Helsinki, where he won a gold medal in the 6 metre class with the boat Llanoria.

Business career
From 1956 to 1966, he was a partner in Dominick & Dominick.  From 1966 to 1982, he worked at Smith Barney, serving as a senior vice president in charge of the corporate finance department, and as vice chairman of Smith Barney in charge of the firm's merger and acquisition activities, a member of the executive committee and a director of Smith Barney International Inc.

In 1982, Morgan, the great-grandson of J. P. Morgan, established a retail and brokerage firm known as Morgan Lewis Githens & Ahn, Inc. In 1985, it organized a leveraged buyout with the Olin Corporation, an industrial chemical concern based in Stamford, Connecticut, of Olin's Ecusta cigarette paper business.  In 1987, the firm assisted with the acquisition of Service America Corp. from Alleco Inc., formerly Allegheny Beverage Corporation, for $450 million in cash and securities.

In 2001, the firm and Morgan's broker-dealer license, was bought by the newly established MLGA Holdings.  Morgan, along with Fred Joseph (1937–2009), the former president and chief executive officer of the investment bank Drexel Burnham Lambert during the 1980s, co-founded the new entity, which became known as Morgan Joseph LLC in 2002, sought to create a high-yield business for mid-size companies and take advantage of investment bankers who were laid off during the technology stock bubble of 2000.  After the new firm was established, Morgan served as chairman of the board of directors of Morgan Lewis.

In December 2010, Morgan Joseph LLC merged with Tri-Artisan Partners LLC to form Morgan Joseph TriArtisan Group, Inc.  In April 2011, Apollo Global Management invested in Morgan Joseph TriArtisan, and registered as a brokerage firm to find clients and deals for its buyout and hedge funds.

Board of trustees
Since 1969, Morgan has served as a director of Upham & Co., Inc. From 1989 until January 1998, he was a director of TriMas Corporation until it was acquired by Metaldyne Corporation. He then served as a director of Metaldyne from 1984 until its recapitalization in November 2000.  As of 2001, he was a director of Furnishings International Inc. and a trustee of the Provident Loan Society of New York.  He is also a director of the Morgan Library & Museum.

Personal life
Morgan has been married five times. In 1953, he married his first wife, Elizabeth Robbins Choate (1933–1998), the daughter of Robert Burnett Choate and the sister of Robert B. Choate Jr. Before their divorce in 1957, they had John Adams Morgan Jr.

His second marriage was in 1962, to Tania Goss, an alumna of the Ethel Walker School and Vassar College who was the daughter of Natalie Holbrook and Chauncey Porter Goss (d. 1964) of Middlebury, Connecticut. Before their divorce, they had Chauncey Goss Morgan, who was the chief financial officer of Senet Inc.

His third marriage was to Anne Chute in 1992. 

In the late 1990s, he met his fourth wife, Sonja Tremont (b. 1963), now known as one of the stars of the Bravo television show, The Real Housewives of New York City.  Morgan and Tremont were said to have met at San Pietro, an Italian restaurant in New York City on Madison Avenue where she was a hostess.  After running into each other again in Aspen, they had dinner together and later that night, he proposed to her.  They were married a few months later in 1998.  Before their divorce 7 years later in 2006, they had one daughter together, Quincy Adams Morgan.

His fifth wife is Connie H. Morgan, whom he married in 2010.

Residences
Morgan owns Caritas Island, a 3.5 acre private island compound off the coast of Stamford, Connecticut with a 26-room, 14,000 square foot home originally built in 1906. In 2011, Morgan listed the island for sale for $18.9 million.

References

External links

1930 births
Living people
People from Oyster Bay (town), New York
Sportspeople from New York (state)
American male sailors (sport)
Sailors at the 1952 Summer Olympics – 6 Metre
Olympic gold medalists for the United States in sailing
Medalists at the 1952 Summer Olympics
Morgan family
Adams political family
Groton School alumni
Yale University alumni